Erle Stillwell House is a historic home located at Hendersonville, Henderson County, North Carolina. It was built in 1926, and is a two-story, L-plan Tudor Revival style brick dwelling.  It has a multi-gable and hip roof with flared gable ends and two brick chimneys with chimney pots.  The entrance and sun porch are covered by ribbed copper roofs.  It was designed and built by locally prominent architect Erle Stillwell, who built the neighboring Erle Stillwell House II in 1935.

It was listed on the National Register of Historic Places in 2001.

References

Houses on the National Register of Historic Places in North Carolina
Tudor Revival architecture in North Carolina
Houses completed in 1926
Houses in Henderson County, North Carolina
National Register of Historic Places in Henderson County, North Carolina
Hendersonville, North Carolina